Young at Heart is an album by trumpeter Howard McGhee and saxophonist Teddy Edwards recorded in 1979 and released on the Storyville label.

Reception 

In his review for AllMusic, Scott Yanow stated "Tenor saxophonist Teddy Edwards was in trumpeter Howard McGhee's group during 1945-47. Over 30 years later they reunited for what would be McGhee's final recording sessions (although the trumpeter lived until 1987). ... McGhee and Edwards are in excellent form on a set filled with bop standards".

Track listing 
 "Relaxing at Camarillo" (Charlie Parker) – 7:36
 "Reflections" (Thelonious Monk) – 6:36
 "Blues in the Closet" (Oscar Pettiford) – 7:27
 "On a Misty Night" (Tadd Dameron) – 4:32
 "In Walked Bud" (Monk) – 4:07
 "Yardbird Suite" (Parker) – 4:07
 "Moose the Mooche" (Parker) – 7:00

Personnel 
Howard McGhee – trumpet
Teddy Edwards – tenor saxophone
Art Hillery – piano
Leroy Vinnegar – bass
Billy Higgins – drums

References 

1979 albums
Teddy Edwards albums
Howard McGhee albums
Storyville Records albums